The Industrial Building is a high-rise building located at 1410 Washington Boulevard in downtown Detroit, Michigan, within the Washington Boulevard Historic District. It occupies the northeast corner on Grand River Avenue and Washington Boulevard.

The building stands 22 storeys tall, with 21 above-ground floors, and one basement level. It was completed in 1928, and is one of the many structures built by architect Louis Kamper on Washington Boulevard in the 1910s and 1920s. Kamper designed the Industrial Building with a mixture of Art Deco, Gothic Revival and Beaux-Arts architectural designs. The upper stories feature several setbacks and piers, and the roof has an intricate design of limestone cornices.

Built as an office building, the tower was later converted to residential use and renamed the Park Place Apartments. A fire struck the building in February 2003, temporarily displacing over 100 residents.

References

Further reading

External links
Google Maps location of the Industrial-Stevens Apartments

Residential skyscrapers in Detroit
Apartment buildings in Detroit
Office buildings on the National Register of Historic Places in Michigan
Art Deco architecture in Michigan
Historic district contributing properties in Michigan
National Register of Historic Places in Detroit
1928 establishments in Michigan
Louis Kamper buildings